Cinematronics Incorporated was an arcade game developer that primarily released vector graphics games in the late 1970s and early 1980s. While other companies released games based on raster displays, early in their history, Cinematronics and Atari, Inc. released vector-display games, which offered a distinctive look and a greater graphic capability (at the time), at the cost of being only black and white (initially). Cinematronics also published Dragon's Lair in 1983, the first major LaserDisc video game.

Beginnings 
Cinematronics Inc. was founded in 1975 by San Diego Chargers football players Dennis Partee and Gary Garrison in Kearny Mesa, California. Soon after, they brought in a third partner named Jim Pierce to manage the company's day-to-day operations. Cinematronics' first games, a Pong clone, a Flipper Ball copy and their first original game design, Embargo, were released in 1975, 1976, and 1977, but they were not particularly notable. In 1977, Pierce and mortgage broker Ralph Clarke bought out Garrison's share of the company.

First success 
In 1977, MIT graduate Larry Rosenthal approached Cinematronics with a custom TTL-based hardware of his own design that could run the mainframe computer game Spacewar! cheaply enough that it could be placed in arcades. Needing a hit to keep the company afloat, Jim Pierce agreed to manufacture it in exchange for a five percent royalty.

Cinematronics introduced the game under the name Space Wars at the annual trade show of the Amusement and Music Operators of America in October 1977, but did not have sufficient funds to enter production. In early 1978, Pierce brought in a new partner, a veteran operator of coin-operated amusements named Tom Stroud. Stroud bought out Partee's share of the company and helped fund the production of Space Wars.

Space Wars was the first arcade game to use black & white vector graphics, which enabled it to display sharper, crisper visuals than the raster displays of the time. Space Wars was the best-selling coin-operated video game of 1978 and ultimately sold more than 7,000 units.
Rosenthal left Cinematronics and formed Vectorbeam. When he attempted to take his "Vectorbeam" technology with him, Pierce and Stroud sued. The men came to an agreement outside of court with Rosenthal selling his company and technology to Cinematronics.

Vector games 
With the "Vectorbeam" board under their control, Cinematronics released a series of vector graphic arcade games including Starhawk, the first one-on-one fighting game Warrior, Sundance and Tail Gunner.

Cinematronics experimented with color overlays on some of their games. In Star Castle, the overlay gave color to several elements of the game with fixed positions. In Armor Attack, the overlay was itself a part of the game: the overlay was a top-down view of a small set of city streets, and the player drove a jeep through the streets fighting tanks and helicopters.

Cinematronics created Cosmic Chasm, a color vector game. Other games were developed based on the same hardware system (based on Motorola's 68000 chip) but were never released, including a 3D color vector game.

Non-vector games 
About 1982, Cinematronics started releasing games which used raster display, such as Naughty Boy and Zzyzzyxx.  During this time Cinematronics filed for Chapter 11 bankruptcy protection.

In 1983 Cinematronics released Dragon's Lair, one of the first laserdisc-based arcade games.  In order to finish the project they partnered with Advanced Microcomputer Systems (later renamed RDI Video Systems), who later tried to sell a home version of the laser-disc machine. While RDI's home console, the Halcyon, was a failure, the Dragon's Lair arcade was a huge success.  Cinematronics followed it up with the similar sci-fi-themed laserdisc game, Space Ace.
In about 1983 some prototype animation material for a Dragon's Lair sequel was produced, but due to the lack of an agreement between Cinematronics and the animator, Don Bluth, this material sat unused for years, eventually becoming part of the Dragon's Lair II: Time Warp game in the 1990s.

About 1984, Cinematronics released Express Delivery and other raster games based on a new hardware platform called the Cinemat System, which was designed to be reusable with replaceable software, control panels, and cabinet artwork.

About 1987, Cinematronics was acquired by Tradewest and renamed the Leland Corporation and continued to make arcade and computer game software. Tradewest was bought out by WMS in 1994 to become their console division.

Games

Early
Flipper Ball (1976)
Embargo (1977)

Vector
Space Wars (1977)
Tail Gunner (1979)
Starhawk (1979)
Sundance (1979)
Warrior (1979)
Armor Attack (1980)
Rip Off (1980). A cocktail version was manufactured under license by Centuri.
Star Castle (1980)
Tail Gunner II (1980). This is a cockpit version of the original made under license by Exidy.
Boxing Bugs (1981)
Solar Quest (1981)
Cosmic Chasm (1983)

LaserDisc
Dragon's Lair (1983)
Space Ace (1984)
Thayer's Quest (1984)

Raster
Freeze (1982)
Jack the Giantkiller (1982)
Naughty Boy (1982)
Zzyzzyxx (1982)
Brix (1983). A conversion kit version of Zzyzzyxx.
Express Delivery (1984)
World Series Baseball (1984)
Cerberus (1985)
Mayhem 2002 (1985)
Power Play (1985)
World Series: The Season (1985)
Danger Zone (1986)
Redline Racer (1986)
Baseball The Season II (1987)
Alley Master (1988)

Unreleased
War of the Worlds (1982)
Hovercraft (1983)

References

Bibliography
Kent, Steven L., The Ultimate History of Video Games, (San Francisco: Sierra Club, 1994) 
Tim Skelly's History of Cinematronics and Vectorbeam Retrieved Jul. 8, 2005.

External links 
 The Dragon's Lair Project history of Laser Disc games
 KLOV.com: Cinematronics — entry on the KLOV−Killer List of Videogames.
 The Dot Eaters.com: History of Cinematronics and the development of early games such as Space Wars
 History of Cinematronics and Vectorbeam by Tim Skelly

1975 establishments in California
1987 disestablishments in California
Companies that filed for Chapter 11 bankruptcy in 1982
 
Companies based in El Cajon, California
Video game companies established in 1975
Video game companies disestablished in 1987
Defunct video game companies of the United States
Video game development companies
Defunct companies based in California
Entertainment companies based in California